The California Collegiate Athletic Association men's basketball tournament is the annual conference basketball championship tournament for the California Collegiate Athletic Association. The tournament was held annually between 1986 and 1995, discontinued between 1996 and 2007, and then held annually again after it was re-established in 2008. It is a single-elimination tournament and seeding is based on regular season records.

The winner, declared conference champion, receives the conference's automatic bid to the NCAA Men's Division II Basketball Championship.

Tournament format
Between 1986 and 1995, the tournament consisted of 4 teams playing a single-elimination tournament on the campus of one of the four teams. After the tournament was re-established in 2008, the tournament expanded to eight teams; first round matches were played on campus sites while the semifinal and final rounds were both played at one single site. Between 2008 and 2012, this site rotated between different campus gyms. After 2013, however, the tournament has been played at a pre-determined neutral arena.

Results

Championship records

Cal State East Bay, Cal State Los Angeles, and Sonoma State have not yet qualified for the CCAA tournament finals.
Cal State Northridge and UC Davis never qualified for the CCAA tournament finals as conference members.
 Schools highlighted in pink are former members of the CCAA.

See also
CCAA women's basketball tournament

References

NCAA Division II men's basketball conference tournaments
Tournament
Recurring sporting events established in 1986